The undulated antpitta (Grallaria squamigera) is a bird in the family Grallariidae. The species was first described by Florent Prévost and Marc Athanase Parfait Œillet des Murs in 1842.

Distribution
The undulated antpitta occurs in Bolivia, Peru, Ecuador, Colombia, and Venezuela. It inhabits subtropical to tropical montane forests, including Polylepis woodlands, and is often associated with Chusquea bamboo thickets.

Description
The undulated antpitta has dark brown upperparts with a gray crown and nape. The throat and moustachial region are white, separated by a black malar line. The underparts are orange to buffy with heavy barring.

References

undulated antpitta
Birds of the Northern Andes
undulated antpitta
undulated antpitta
Taxonomy articles created by Polbot